Ramdane Djamel is a district in Skikda Province, Algeria. It is one of 3 districts in the province that do not lie on the Mediterranean Sea. It was named after its capital, Ramdane Djamel.

Municipalities
The district is further divided into 2 municipalities:
Ramdane Djamel
Béni Béchir

Districts of Skikda Province